Michelangelo Merano (born 1867) was an Italian painter, primarily of genre canvases and portraits.

Biography
Gastaldi was born in Racconigi, and he trained at the Accademia Albertina under the painter Andrea Gastaldi and the patronage of Giuseppe Simondetti. He made portraits of Giovanni Battista Diatto and CF Roggeri. Among his other works, are those titled: Maria, Carezze di sole, Sconforto, Fior di terra, Apre les bains, Jolanda, Ave Maria, and Super Nivem Dealbabor.

References

1867 births
Accademia Albertina alumni
19th-century Italian painters
Italian male painters
19th-century Italian male artists
People from Racconigi
Year of death missing